Danila Maksimovich Bokov (born 9 August 2002) is a Russian football player. He plays for FC Salyut Belgorod on loan from PFC CSKA Moscow.

Club career
He was first included in the matchday squads of PFC CSKA Moscow as a back-up goalkeeper in February 2021. He made his debut for the main squad of PFC CSKA Moscow on 26 October 2021 in a Russian Cup game against FC Metallurg Lipetsk. He substituted Vladislav Torop in the 73rd minute after Torop was injured, as first-choice goalkeeper Igor Akinfeev was given rest for this game.

On 30 December 2021, he extended his contract with CSKA until the end of the 2022–23 season.

On 17 February 2023, Bokov was loaned by FC Salyut Belgorod.

Personal life
His father Maksim Bokov is a former Russian international defender who is best known for playing for FC Zenit Saint Petersburg and PFC CSKA Moscow.

Career statistics

References

External links
 
 
 
 

2002 births
Living people
Russian footballers
Association football goalkeepers
PFC CSKA Moscow players
FC Salyut Belgorod players